Kenny Dale Monday (born November 25, 1961) is an Olympic gold medalist and three-time All-American wrestler from Oklahoma State University. He began wrestling at age six at a YMCA after-school program and grew up idolizing Olympic wrestler Wayne Wells. Monday was a three-time Olympian.

Monday attended Booker T. Washington High School in Tulsa, Oklahoma, where he won four state titles and the 1977 Junior National championship. He never lost a match from seventh grade through the end of high school and finished with a record of 140-0-1.

As an All-American at OSU, Monday won the NCAA title in 1984 at 150 pounds. His collegiate record of 121-12-2 contributed to the Cowboys winning two Big Eight titles. He won the 1989 World Championship and a series of USA Freestyle championships in 1985, 1988, 1991, and 1996. He won the Olympic Championship in 1988 in a 5–2 overtime win against the Soviet Union's Adlan Varaev.

Monday was a silver medalist in the 1992 Olympics and placed sixth in the 1996 Atlanta Summer Olympics. In 2001, Monday was inducted into the National Wrestling Hall of Fame as a Distinguished Member.

On March 28, 1997, Monday competed in a mixed martial arts bout defeating John Lewis by TKO in round two at Extreme fighting 4, which was held in Des Moines, Iowa.

Monday has also worked as the wrestling coach with the Blackzilians, a mixed martial arts camp based in Boca Raton, Florida. He is married to Sabrina Goodwin Monday (National Sales Director for Mary Kay Cosmetics) and has three children. Both his sons would become NCAA Division I wrestlers. His oldest son Kennedy wrestled for the University of North Carolina, and his younger son Quincy currently wrestles for Princeton University. Monday currently resides in North Carolina.

On August 15, 2022, Monday was announced as the head wrestling coach at Morgan State University.

Mixed martial arts record

|-
| Win
| align=center | 1–0
| John Lewis
| TKO (punches)
| Extreme fighting 4
| 
| align=center | 2
| align=center | 4:23
| Des Moines, Iowa, USA
|

Submission grappling record
KO PUNCHES
|- style="text-align:center; background:#f0f0f0;"
| style="border-style:none none solid solid; "|Result
| style="border-style:none none solid solid; "|Opponent
| style="border-style:none none solid solid; "|Method
| style="border-style:none none solid solid; "|Event
| style="border-style:none none solid solid; "|Date
| style="border-style:none none solid solid; "|Round
| style="border-style:none none solid solid; "|Time
| style="border-style:none none solid solid; "|Notes
|-
|Loss|| Matt Hume || Submission (toe hold) || The Contenders|| October 11, 1997|| 1|| 0:45||
|-

See also
 List of Oklahoma State University Olympians

References

External links
 
 Sherdog

1961 births
Living people
Sportspeople from Tulsa, Oklahoma
Booker T. Washington High School (Tulsa, Oklahoma) alumni
Oklahoma State University alumni
Oklahoma State Cowboys wrestlers
Wrestlers at the 1988 Summer Olympics
Wrestlers at the 1992 Summer Olympics
Wrestlers at the 1996 Summer Olympics
American male sport wrestlers
Olympic gold medalists for the United States in wrestling
Olympic silver medalists for the United States in wrestling
People from Stillwater, Oklahoma
Medalists at the 1992 Summer Olympics
Medalists at the 1988 Summer Olympics
Pan American Games gold medalists for the United States
Pan American Games medalists in wrestling
Wrestlers at the 1991 Pan American Games
Medalists at the 1991 Pan American Games
African-American sport wrestlers